John II, Lord of Egmond ( – 4 January 1451) was the son of Arnold I of Egmond (d. 9 April 1409, the son of John I and Guida D'Armstall) and Jolanthe of Leiningen (d. 24 April 1434, the daughter of Frederick VIII of Leningen and Jolanthe of Jülich).
On 23 June 1409 John married Maria van Arkel daughter of John V van Arkel and Joanna of Jülich, and had two sons:
Arnold, Duke of Guelders
William IV, Count of Egmond

References
rootsweb Accessed November 28, 2008
http://www.thepeerage.com/p469.htm#i4689

1385 births
1451 deaths
John 2
People from Egmond
14th-century people of the Holy Roman Empire
15th-century people of the Holy Roman Empire